The Gansz Trophy is awarded to the winner of the United States Naval Academy and Southern Methodist University rivalry football game. It was created in 2009 through a collaboration between the two athletic departments. The trophy is named for Frank Gansz who played linebacker at the Naval Academy from 1957 through 1959.  Gansz later served as the head coach of the Kansas City Chiefs and on the coaching staffs at Navy and SMU.

Game results

See also  
 List of NCAA college football rivalry games

References

College football rivalry trophies in the United States
Navy Midshipmen football
SMU Mustangs football
College football rivalries in the United States